Nusa-kor-kamuy (ヌサ・コﾙ・カムイ) is an Ainu kamuy (god).  Called the community-founding kamuy, he represents the dead and serves as a messenger to the other kamuy.

Mythology
Nusa-kor-kamuy is the originator of nusa or inau, sacred carved wands that represent the kamuy in Ainu ritual.  He is responsible for maintaining the row of inau arranged outside of a traditional Ainu dwelling, and he carries the inau and other offerings to the gods, along with humans' messages of reverence.  He is called upon to assist in rituals, ensuring that the respect behind them is properly conveyed to the kamuy.  He is assisted in his tasks by Yushkep Kamuy, the spider goddess.

Nusa-kor-kamuy is usually said to be the brother of the snake god, Kina-sut-kamuy, but sometimes the two are regarded as a single entity. Nusa-kor-kamuy is also sometimes presented as a female deity.

Notes

References
Ashkenazy, Michael. Handbook of Japanese Mythology. Santa Barbara, California: ABC-Clio, 2003.
Etter, Carl. Ainu Folklore: Traditions and Culture of the Vanishing Aborigines of Japan. Chicago: Wilcox and Follett, 1949.
Munro, Neil Gordon. Ainu Creed and Cult. New York: Columbia University Press, 1995.

Ainu kamuy
Messenger gods